Statistics of Turkish First Football League in the 1998–99 season.

Overview
It was contested by 18 teams, and Galatasaray S.K. won the championship. And demotion of Sakaryaspor, Çanakkale Dardanelspor, Karabükspor was decided.

League table

Results

Top scorers

References

Turkey - List of final tables (RSSSF)

Süper Lig seasons
1998–99 in Turkish football
Turkey